Ghunzakhi which is also known as Khajoor is a traditional cookie in Pashtun areas usually served to guests, married sisters, and daughters on returning to their husbands' homes after spending some days with parents, brothers, or uncles. The cookie  is made from lightly leavened dough, which is prepared with sugar or gur, caramelized in oil or water, and mixed with flour, pinch or baking soda, and fennel seeds.

See also
 List of pastries

References

Pastries
Pashtun cuisine